Dar el Koudia Airfield is an abandoned World War II military airfield in Tunisia, in the vicinity of Bizerte. It was used by the United States Army Air Force Twelfth Air Force during the North African Campaign.  The airfield was used by the 310th Bombardment Group, flying B-25 Mitchells from the field between 6  June and 5 August 1943.

Today, the location of the airfield is undetermined, as urban expansion in the Bizerte area has erased evidence of the field.

References

 Maurer, Maurer. Air Force Combat Units of World War II. Maxwell AFB, Alabama: Office of Air Force History, 1983. .

External links

Airfields of the United States Army Air Forces in Tunisia
Bizerte
Airports established in 1943